Proteoideae is one of the five subfamilies of the plant family Proteaceae. The greatest diversity is in Africa, but there are also many species in Australia; a few species occur in South America, New Caledonia, and elsewhere.

Taxonomy
Proteoideae was essentially defined by Robert Brown in his 1810 On the natural order of plants called Proteaceae. Brown divided Proteaceae into two "sections" based on whether or not the fruits were dehiscent or indehiscence. He also noted that  Brown's two "sections" corresponded closely with what are now recognised as the two largest Proteaceae subfamilies, Proteoideae and Grevilleoideae, and both the indehiscence of Proteoideae and the paired flowers of Grevilleoideae are still recognised as key diagnostic characters.

Brown did not publish names for his two sections, and it would not be until 1836 that the name Proteoideae would be published by Amos Eaton. The modern framework for classification of the genera within Proteaceae was laid by L. A. S. Johnson and Barbara Briggs in their influential 1975 monograph "On the Proteaceae: the evolution and classification of a southern family". Their classification has been refined somewhat over the ensuing three decades, mot notably by Peter Weston and Nigel Barker in 2006, who included in Proteoideae the monophyletic Eidotheoideae, but separated from it two genera as the new Symphionematoideae. Proteaceae is now divided into five subfamilies, of which Proteoideae is the second largest. It is defined as those species having cluster roots, solitary ovules and indehiscent fruits. Proteoideae is further divided into four tribes: Conospermeae, Petrophileae, Proteae and Leucadendreae:
Family Proteaceae
Subfamily Bellendenoideae (1 genus, Bellendena)
Subfamily Persoonioideae (2 tribes, 5 genera)
Subfamily Symphionematoideae (2 genera)
Subfamily Proteoideae
incertae sedis
Eidothea — Beauprea — Beaupreopsis — Dilobeia — Cenarrhenes — Franklandia
Tribe Conospermeae
Subtribe Stirlingiinae
Stirlingia
Subtribe Conosperminae
Conospermum — Synaphea
Tribe Petrophileae
Petrophile — Aulax
Tribe Proteeae
Protea — Faurea
Tribe Leucadendreae
Subtribe Isopogoninae
Isopogon
Subtribe Adenanthinae
Adenanthos
Subtribe Leucadendrinae
Leucadendron — Serruria — Paranomus — Vexatorella — Sorocephalus — Spatalla — Leucospermum — Mimetes — Diastella — Orothamnus
Subfamily Grevilleoideae (4 tribes, 10 subtribes, 31 genera)

Distribution and habitat
Like the family as a whole, Proteoideae has a southern hemisphere distribution, spanning Africa, Australia and South America. Africa is the main centre of biodiversity. Australia has similar number of genera but fewer species. The subfamily is poorly represented in South America.

References

Proteaceae
Eudicot subfamilies